The women's 1000 meter at the 2011 KNSB Dutch Single Distance Championships took place in Heerenveen at the Thialf ice skating rink on Saturday 6 November 2010. Although this tournament was held in 2010, it was part of the speed skating season 2010–2011.

There were 22 participants.

Title holder was Annette Gerritsen.

Statistics

Result

Draw

Source:

References 

Single Distance Championships
2011 Single Distance
World